Allium nanodes is a plant species native to the Sichuan and Yunnan regions of southern China. It grows in open areas at elevations of 3300–5200 m.

Allium nanodes is unusual in the genus in several respects. Leaves are opposite, green tinged with purple, broadly oblong, up to 9 cm long and up to 3 cm wide. Scape is extremely short, rarely more than 5 cm tall. Flowers are white, sometimes with a slight reddish tinge.

References

nanodes
Onions
Flora of China
Flora of Sichuan
Plants described in 1931
Flora of Yunnan